Frances Rice may refer to:

Frances J. Rice, responsible for the establishment of Old Town Historic District (Huntsville, Alabama)
Frances Rice, character in Peril at End House (play)
Frances V. Rice, co-author with Wallace Rice

See also
Francis Rice (disambiguation)